Émile Peynaud (June 29, 1912 – July 18, 2004) was a French oenologist and researcher who has been credited with revolutionizing winemaking in the latter half of the 20th century, and has been called "the forefather of modern oenology".

Biography 
Peynaud entered the wine trade at the age of fifteen with the négociant Maison Calvet. At Calvet he worked under the chemical engineer Jean Ribéreau-Gayon, and they developed methods of analysing the wines that were to be purchased. In 1946, Peynaud completed his Doctorate at the University of Bordeaux and joined its faculty as a lecturer. Ribéreau-Gayon at this time was also teaching at the University, and the two shifted their previous focus of problems faced by Calvet to the problems faced by the winemakers themselves.

While at the University of Bordeaux, where he became a professor of oenology, Peynaud worked at providing scientific explanations for many problems encountered in the process of winemaking. He convinced the wineries to begin picking of grapes at vineyards up to two weeks later than usual, and to complete the picking as quickly as possible. The practice of also picking underripe or rotten grapes was abandoned, so that the selected fruit arriving at the winery was of the best possible quality.

Peynaud introduced crushing and fermenting fruit in separate batches based on vine age, vineyard location, or any other factor that resulted in fruit of differing qualities in order to control tannin extraction. He then applied the cool fermentations used in Champagne to still white Bordeaux in order to control fermentation temperatures.

Proposing methods that ran counter to many traditions, in the 1950s and 1960s, skeptics would use the term "Peynaudization" of Bordeaux, but as his advice usually produced superior wines, criticism came to an end.

Peynaud considered the control of malolactic fermentation to be one of his most important contributions to winemaking. It was commonly believed that malolactic fermentation was a sickness. He helped the wineries realize that they needed to encourage and control malolactic fermentation. He also stated, "Using only the very best grapes is a new phenomenon," considering this "the crowning achievement of [his] work."

Peynaud was the Decanter Man of the Year in 1990. Michel Rolland is one of his pupils.

Selected bibliography

See also 
List of wine personalities

References 

1912 births
2004 deaths
French food scientists
French winemakers
University of Bordeaux alumni
Bordeaux wine
Oenologists